The Roman Catholic Diocese of Penedo is a diocese located in the city of Penedo in the Ecclesiastical province of Maceió in Brazil.

History
 April 3, 1916: Established as Diocese of Penedo from the Diocese of Alagôas

Bishops
 Bishops of Penedo (Roman rite), in reverse chronological order
 Bishop Valdemir Ferreira dos Santos (2021.08.18 – ...)
 Bishop Valério Breda, S.D.B. (1997.07.30 – 2020.06.16) 
 Bishop Constantino José Lüers, O.F.M. (1976.03.24 – 1994.01.26)
 Bishop José Terceiro de Sousa (1957.11.09 – 1976.03.24)
 Bishop Felix César da Cunha Vasconcellos, O.F.M. (1949.03.30 – 1957.04.03), appointed Coadjutor Archbishop of Florianópolis, Santa Catarina
 Bishop Fernando Gomes dos Santos (1943.01.09 – 1949.02.01), appointed Bishop of Aracajú; future Archbishop
 Bishop Jonas de Araújo Batinga (1918.01.28 – 1940.07.30)

References
 GCatholic.org
 Catholic Hierarchy

Roman Catholic dioceses in Brazil
Christian organizations established in 1916
Penedo, Roman Catholic Diocese of
Roman Catholic dioceses and prelatures established in the 20th century